Mount Christensen is a prominent ice-covered mountain,  high, at the southwest side of Rayner Glacier in Enderby Land. It was discovered on 13 January 1930 by the British Australian New Zealand Antarctic Research Expedition under Mawson, who named it for Consul Lars Christensen, Norwegian whaling magnate and promoter of several Norwegian Antarctic expeditions.

References
 

Mountains of Enderby Land